Chnodomar (Latinized Chnodomarius) was the king of an Alamannic canton in what is now south-west Germany, near the Rhine from sometime before 352 till 357. He seems to have had a recognized position among the other Alamanni.

Early career 

Chnodomar was a king of one of the Germanic tribes of the Rhineland, originating in eastern Germany beyond the Elbe, and believed to have migrated to the west early in the 3rd century AD, whose confederacy is known under the general name of Alemans or Alemanni.

In 352, during Magnentius' rebellion, Chnodomar engaged in a battle with Magnentius' brother, the Caesar Decentius, defeating him. Chnodomar is believed to have been instigated to invade Gaul by Constantius II, whose brother's throne Magnentius had usurped. At the end of the civil war, however, the barbarians refused to relinquish the territory and spoil which they had acquired in their war upon the rebellious province. Successive generals were appointed by Constantius to eject them, while they ravaged the country, and occupied the suburbs of the principal cities. Chnodomar, as one of the most powerful of the Alemannic kings, assumed a prominent place in the conduct of the war. Ammianus appears to suggest that it was he who persuaded the Alemans to break the agreement with Constantius in persisting to make war upon Roman Gaul after the usurper's death. He is known to have commanded the army which defeated the Roman Magister Peditum (Master of Foot) Barbatio in 357, driving him south to Augst, and disabling him from 
further action during the campaign.

Battle of Strasbourg

A simultaneous pincer movement had been conceived by the Romans, Barbatio marching right of the Rhine from near Basle with 25,000 men while the Caesar Julian attacked from the left towards Strasbourg with 13,000. Not to mention it rendered the execution of the scheme impracticable, Barbatio's defeat left Julian vulnerable and exposed to the enemy in what was now the midst of their territory, near Saverne. Chnodomar, who had been outnumbered in his victory over Barbatio, was filled with confidence in his ability to destroy the Caesar, stationed at Saverne, as a deserter from the Roman camp made known to him, and cut off from retreat.

To effect Julian's destruction, Chnodomar and the allied chiefs with him mustered the utmost strength of the coalition for the battle, numbering seven kings, ten petty princes, and thirty-five thousand common soldiers, assembling at Strasbourg. Chnodomar, along with his nephew Serapio, was entrusted by the confederate chiefs with overall command, in deference to his superior might and reputation as conqueror of Decentius and Barbatio. Julian was undeterred, however, and in the ensuing battle his self-confidence was justified by complete victory. Chnodomar commanded the left of the Alemannic forces during the battle, composed chiefly of cavalry, and by a skillful stratagem (and an interesting early example of combined-arms warfare) he contrived to drive the heavy cavalry of the Romans in a panic from the field. But the routed Clibanarii were personally rallied by Julian, who had positioned himself in reserve for just such a contingency. Led by their royal general, the Roman curissiars turned to second the infantry with reignited courage. But it was rather by the unyielding defense of the shieldwall of Roman infantry, which frustrated the impetuosity, and broke the strength of the Alemanni, that the signal victory of Strasbourg was obtained.

Although Chnodomar had entered the battle on a spirited charger which emphasized his uncommon height and the splendor of his arms, he dismounted early on along with his fellow chiefs at the demand of the tribesmen, who were afraid of their desertion in the event of reversal. Apparently, their fears were justified; as soon as the tide of battle turned in Julian's favour,  Chnodomar slipped away with a small body of retainers to the river-bank, where he had expeditiously ordered a vessel to be kept in readiness, should a speedy retreat prove necessary. He was intercepted, however, on the verge of the river, being recognized by the very arms and armor which had rendered his appearance so formidable on the field of battle, he was made a prisoner, along with two-hundred of the bravest warriors of his household, and brought to the Caesar's tent.

Death 

After repeatedly assuring the disheartened chieftain of his safety as sacred to the honour of the Empire, Julian dispatched him in chains to the court of Constantius, where he was treated with conspicuous honour.  Regardless, he died not long after in the Imperial city, the victim reportedly of a commonplace illness, perhaps exacerbated by the bitterness of his exile and defeat.

Character 

Ammianus Marcellinus, in his account of The Battle of Strasbourg, alludes to the “vast personal strength” of Chnodomar, “on which he confided much”, and calls him “brave as a warrior and general, eminent for skill above his fellows”. At the same time, his height and brute physical strength, conspicuous even among barbarians, are commented upon. However, not all aspects of his personality will appear so favourably. It is admitted that, when brought before Julian's council at the conclusion of the battle of Strasbourg, he was trembling and struck dumb with terror, and then cast himself abjectly at Julian's feet, imploring his mercy in frenzied convulsions of remorse and fear. A bemused Caesar was obliged to exhort him to fortitude. Ammianus, as a Roman soldier, though not present at the battle, observes with satisfaction, that his appearance at the time was much altered from the ferocious savage who had once so volubly blustered of his martial superiority to the Romans.

Footnotes

References
Cameron, Averil & Peter Garnsey editors, The Cambridge Ancient History, Volume 13. CUP, Cambridge, 1998. 
Drinkwater, John F., The Alamanni and Rome 213-496 (Caracalla to Clovis), OUP Oxford 2007. 
Potter, David S. The Roman Empire at Bay AD180-395, Routledge, New York, 2004, 
Gibbon, Edward, The Decline And Fall Of The Roman Empire, The Modern Library, New York, 1932.
Ammianus Marcellinus, The History, Kindle Edition

4th-century monarchs in Europe
Alemannic rulers
Alemannic warriors